Ensenada de Guapilacuy (Blight of Guapilacuy) is a broad bay on the eastern shore of Lacuy Peninsula in northern Chiloé Island. It was formerly known as  Puerto Inglés (literally English port) after the English corsair George Shelvocke who stayed in the bay in 1719. Before that, Hendrik Brouwer, the leader of the Dutch expedition to Valdivia died in the bay on August 7, 1643 before reaching Valdivia.

References

Bays of Chile
Chiloé Archipelago
Bodies of water of Los Lagos Region